Kuppa may refer to:

 Kuppa, Republic of Dagestan, a rural locality in Dagestan, Russia
 Kuppa, the main character of Captain Kuppa
 Bowser, the Mario character known in Japan as "Kuppa" or "Koopa"
 A Japanese transliteration of Gukbap, a Korean soup and rice dish